The Allan Memorial Institute (AMI), also known colloquially as "The Allan", is a former psychiatric hospital and research institute located at 1025 Pine Avenue West in Montreal, Quebec. 

It is situated on the slope of Mount Royal on the McGill University downtown campus in what was the Golden Square Mile of Montreal. It is named in memory of Sir Hugh Allan, whose former mansion, Ravenscrag, it occupies.

The Allan Memorial's emergency room and use as an active psychiatric hospital ceased in 2015, when a new, modern, psychiatry department was opened at the Montreal General Hospital.

It currently houses outpatient psychiatric services for Montreal General Hospital, part of the McGill University Health Centre. 

Although currently a respected institution, the Institute is also known for its dark role in the CIA's Project MKUltra, an initiative to develop drug-induced mind control. MKUltra experimentation was undertaken at the Institute between 1957 and 1964 by its founding director, Donald Ewen Cameron.

See also 
 Douglas Hospital
 Project MKUltra
 Royal Victoria Hospital, Montreal
 William Sargant

References

External links
 
 Psychology Department – Royal Victoria Hospital
 Psychiatry Clinic – McGill University Health Centre
 Mental Health – McGill University Health Centre
 Allan Memorial Institute "Ravenscrag"

Hospitals in Montreal
Psychiatric hospitals in Canada
Hospitals established in 1940
Defunct hospitals in Canada
Italianate architecture in Canada
Mount Royal
Human subject research in psychiatry
Castles in Canada
Project MKUltra
McGill University buildings
University and college buildings completed in 1940